Zhang Xuan (713–755) was a Chinese painter who lived during the Tang Dynasty (618–907).

Zhang Xuan painted many pieces of art, one of his best-known paintings is Court Ladies Preparing Newly Woven Silk, of which a single copy survives painted by Emperor Huizong of Song (r. 1100–1125) in the early 12th century. He also painted the Spring Outing of the Tang Court, which was later remade by Li Gonglin.

See also 

 Tang dynasty painting

References

Tang dynasty painters
713 births
755 deaths
Artists from Xi'an
8th-century Chinese painters
Painters from Shaanxi